Hudson is a town in Fremont County, Wyoming, United States. The population was 458 at the 2010 census.

History
A post office called Hudson has been in operation since 1907. The town was named for John T. Hudson, the original owner of the town site.

Geography
The northernmost part of the town (north of First Street) is located within the Wind River Indian Reservation.

Demographics

2010 census
As of the census of 2010, there were 458 people, 193 households, and 134 families residing in the town. The racial makeup of the town was 90.2% White, 6.8% Native American, 1.1% from other races, and 2.0% from two or more races. Hispanic or Latino of any race were 3.7% of the population.

There were 193 households, of which 29.5% had children under the age of 18 living with them, 50.8% were married couples living together, 10.4% had a female householder with no husband present, 8.3% had a male householder with no wife present, and 30.6% were non-families. 26.4% of all households were made up of individuals, and 7.2% had someone living alone who was 65 years of age or older. The average household size was 2.37 and the average family size was 2.76.

The median age in the town was 42.3 years. 23.4% of residents were under the age of 18; 7.6% were between the ages of 18 and 24; 23.4% were from 25 to 44; 30% were from 45 to 64; and 15.7% were 65 years of age or older. The gender makeup of the town was 50.4% male and 49.6% female.

2000 census
As of the census of 2000, there were 407 people, 171 households, and 112 families residing in the town. The population density was 968.4 people per square mile (374.2/km2). There were 209 housing units at an average density of 497.3 per square mile (192.1/km2). The racial makeup of the town was 92.63% White, 0.25% African American, 2.21% Native American, 1.47% from other races, and 3.44% from two or more races. Hispanic or Latino of any race were 4.91% of the population.

There were 171 households, out of which 26.3% had children under the age of 18 living with them, 52.0% were married couples living together, 9.9% had a female householder with no husband present, and 34.5% were non-families. 32.2% of all households were made up of individuals, and 13.5% had someone living alone who was 65 years of age or older. The average household size was 2.38 and the average family size was 3.03.

In the town, the population was spread out, with 25.8% under the age of 18, 6.1% from 18 to 24, 26.5% from 25 to 44, 24.8% from 45 to 64, and 16.7% who were 65 years of age or older. The median age was 40 years. For every 100 females, there were 99.5 males. For every 100 females age 18 and over, there were 93.6 males.

The median income for a household in the town was $26,563, and the median income for a family was $34,375. Males had a median income of $30,469 versus $19,125 for females. The per capita income for the town was $15,515. About 12.5% of families and 13.1% of the population were below the poverty line, including 16.1% of those under age 18 and 16.0% of those age 65 or over.

Education
Public education in the town of Hudson is provided by Fremont County School District #1.

References

Towns in Fremont County, Wyoming
Towns in Wyoming
1907 establishments in Wyoming
Populated places established in 1907